"Give Me Just One Night (Una Noche)" is a song by American boy band 98 Degrees, released as the first single from their third studio album, Revelation, on July 31, 2000. It was a success for the group, reaching number two on the US Billboard Hot 100 and on the Canadian RPM Top Singles chart, becoming the band's highest-charting solo effort in both nations. The song was not as successful internationally but did reach the top 40 in Australia, Sweden, and the Netherlands. The single was certified gold by Recording Industry Association of America for sales of 500,000 units.

Track listings
US and European CD single
 "Give Me Just One Night (Una Noche)" (album version) – 3:25
 "Give Me Just One Night (Una Noche)" (Spanish version) – 3:25

UK CD1
 "Give Me Just One Night (Una Noche)" (radio edit) – 3:24
 "Give Me Just One Night (Una Noche)" (Hex Hector radio edit) – 3:42
 "Give Me Just One Night (Una Noche)" (Hex Hector club remix) – 9:29
 "Give Me Just One Night (Una Noche)" (video)

UK CD2
 "Give Me Just One Night (Una Noche)" (radio edit)
 "Can You Imagine"
 "Never Let Go" (Hex Hector club remix)

Australian CD single
 "Give Me Just One Night (Una Noche)" (album version) – 3:25
 "Give Me Just One Night (Una Noche)" (Spanish version) – 3:25
 "Give Me Just One Night (Una Noche)" (Hex Hector radio edit) – 3:42
 "Give Me Just One Night (Una Noche)" (video) – 3:25

Charts

Weekly charts

Year-end charts

Certifications

Release history

References

2000 singles
2000 songs
98 Degrees songs
Songs written by Anders Bagge
Songs written by Arnthor Birgisson
Universal Music Group singles